Guy Wilks (born 22 January 1981) is a British rally driver. Wilks started rallying at the age of 19, but currently drives for JRM in the FIA World Rallycross Championship. In 2011 Wilks drove for Peugeot UK in the Intercontinental Rally Challenge. In 2012 he did not compete.

Career

Wilks who was born in Bishop Auckland, County Durham became Ford Ka Junior Champion in 2000 in his first year in the sport, graduating within the Ford 'Ladder of Opportunity' scheme to the Puma 1400 series for 2001. He finished second in the championship. The following year Wilks entered the British Rally Championship (BRC) in a Super 1600 specification Puma, finishing fifth overall in the championship and third in the British Super1600 Rally Championship. In 2003 Wilks competed in the Junior World Rally Championship (JWRC) driving a Ford Puma prepared by Chris Birkbeck Motorsport finishing seventh in the standings. Wilks missed out on an opportunity to join the Subaru World Rally Team for the 2004 season, as he had signed a contract with Suzuki. 

For 2004 Wilks made the switch from Ford to a works entry in the JWRC with Suzuki driving an Ignis alongside Per-Gunnar Andersson. Over the next three years Wilks won five rallies and finished second in the JWRC in 2005. Wins included his first JWRC victory at the Acropolis Rally in 2004 and Rally GB in the same year. During his time driving for Suzuki Wilks also won the British Super 1600 title and British Junior title in 2005.

Wilks split with Suzuki at the end of 2006 as they moved their focus to a full-fledged enter in World Rally Championship (WRC). In 2007 Wilks joined the Mitsubishi Motors UK Works team driving a Group N specification Mitsubishi Lancer Evolution IX in the BRC. Over the next two years Wilks won eight rallies and the BRC title outright.

In addition to the BRC in 2007, Wilks also competed in a number of WRC events with Mobil 1 support allowing him to make his World Rally Car debut in Norway driving a Ford Focus 03 WRC. In total he competed in seven events with a sixth place in Rally Ireland his best finish in a Subaru S11 WRC.

2008 saw Wilks supplement his BRC commitments with several outings in a Honda Civic Type R R3 rally car for Italy's JAS Motorsport.

Wilks made the switch in 2009 to S2000 class rallying with Mellors Elliot Motorsport driving a Proton Satria Neo Super 2000 car in the Pirelli International Rally. Then, on 6 June 2009, Proton announced an entry for Wilks in the Intercontinental Rally Challenge (IRC). He competed in six events with Proton before making the switch to drive for Škoda UK in Rally Scotland which he won.

On 12 January 2010, it was announced that Wilks would compete on selected rounds of the 2010 IRC driving a Škoda Fabia S2000 for Škoda UK. In the first four rallies of the season, Guy finished 6th in Rallye Monte-Carlo, 2nd in Rally Internacional de Curitiba, 2nd in Rally Argentina and 3rd in Rally Islas Canarias.

During the first stage of the 2010 Rally d'Italia Sardegna Wilks crashed his Škoda and was flown to hospital after reporting pains in his lower back. Hospital checks found the Wilks had fractures to his first and second lumbar vertebrae. The injury meant that Wilks missed three events on the IRC Calendar making a comeback at the Barum Czech Rally Zlín at the end of August.

It was confirmed that Wilks, who finished the year in sixth overall in the championship, would make the switch from Škoda to the Kronos Racing run Peugeot UK Team for the 2011 IRC.

Racing record

Complete WRC results
(key)

JWRC results
(key)

PWRC results
(key)

Complete IRC results
(key)

Complete FIA World Rallycross Championship results
(key)

Supercar

References

External links
Guy Wilks Official Site
IRC Official Site

English rally drivers
Intercontinental Rally Challenge drivers
World Rally Championship drivers
World Rallycross Championship drivers
Sportspeople from Darlington
Living people
1981 births
People educated at Barnard Castle School
Peugeot Sport drivers
Škoda Motorsport drivers